The Battles of Frenchtown, also known as the Battle of the River Raisin and the River Raisin Massacre, were a series of conflicts in Michigan Territory that took place from January 18–23, 1813, during the War of 1812. It was fought between the United States of America and a joint force of British and Native American near the River Raisin in Frenchtown, (present-day Monroe, Michigan).

On January 18, 1813, the Americans forced the retreat of the British and their Native American allies from Frenchtown, which they had earlier occupied, in a relatively minor skirmish. The movement was part of a larger United States plan to advance north and retake Fort Detroit, following its loss in the Siege of Detroit the previous summer. Despite this initial success, the British and Native Americans rallied and launched a surprise counterattack four days later on January 22. Ill-prepared, the Americans lost 397 soldiers in this second battle, while 547 were taken prisoner. Dozens of wounded prisoners were murdered the next day in a massacre by the Native Americans. More prisoners were killed if they could not keep up on the forced march to Fort Malden. This was the deadliest conflict recorded on Michigan soil, and the casualties included the highest number of Americans killed in a single battle during the War of 1812.

Parts of the original battlefield were designated as a state historic park and added to the National Register of Historic Places. In 2009 Congress authorized its upgrade into the River Raisin National Battlefield Park, one of four such parks in the nation and the only one commemorating the War of 1812.

Naming
The Battle of Frenchtown took place in and around the Frenchtown Settlement, founded in 1784 on the River Raisin in the Michigan Territory. The land it was fought on is now incorporated into the city of Monroe. Some sources apply the name only to the encounter on January 22, 1813, and refer to the engagement on January 18 as the First Battle of the River Raisin, or simply as a prelude to the larger encounter on January 22. The plural Battles of Frenchtown is also used for the overall conflict from January 18 through 22. While the battle began on January 18, the heaviest fighting took place on January 22 and may have continued for several days after that. It is often referred to as the Battle of the River Raisin, because of its proximity to that river.

The engagement may be divided into the First Battle of the River Raisin (January 18) and the Second Battle of the River Raisin (January 22). The name "River Raisin Massacre" is used to describe January 23, the day after the second battle, when British-allied Native Americans killed dozens of the mostly volunteer soldiers from Kentucky who were too badly injured to march overland to Canada.

Background

On August 17, 1812, Brigadier General William Hull, commanding the American Army of the Northwest, surrendered his troops and Fort Detroit to the British army following the Siege of Detroit. This early success convinced many Native Americans to side with Britain in the war. General Hull was later tried by a military court and sentenced to death for his "disgraceful conduct" at Detroit. However, President James Madison commuted the sentence to dismissal from the army in recognition of Hull's honorable service during the American Revolution.

At that time, Fort Detroit was a strategic outpost and a potential base for any US invasion of British Upper Canada. Its loss to the British gave them a base to increase their presence in the Michigan Territory. When the British captured Detroit, the Frenchtown militia also surrendered and were disarmed. They urged the Americans to regroup and drive the invaders back to Upper Canada.

Following Hull's dismissal, Brigadier General James Winchester was given command of the Army of the Northwest. Instead of pushing north to retake Detroit, Winchester had a less ambitious plan. His resulting unpopularity caused the command to be given to Major General William Henry Harrison. Winchester was retained as second-in-command. Harrison's first plan on taking command was to march his men north and recover Detroit. To accomplish this, he divided the army into two columns. Harrison would lead one column, with the other led by Winchester.
Meanwhile, Colonel Henry Procter, commanding the British Army around Detroit, assembled all the British troops available, supported by about 500 Native Americans under the Shawnee leader Tecumseh. While Tecumseh was present during the Frenchtown fighting, he did not participate and left before the massacre.

First Battle of the River Raisin

James Winchester, the second-in-command of the Army of the Northwest, led a column consisting of approximately 1,000 inexperienced regulars and volunteers, most of whom came from Kentucky. Instead, Winchester ignored his orders and sent a small relief detachment north to Frenchtown along the River Raisin.

Lieutenant Colonel William Lewis led these men across the frozen Maumee River and along the shore of Lake Erie to the River Raisin. His force consisted of 666 Kentuckians and about 100 local French-speaking Michigan militiamen. On January 18, 1813, Lewis charged across the frozen River Raisin to attack the British and Indian camp, which contained 63 soldiers of the Essex Militia, accompanied by a 3-pounder cannon, and about 200 Potawatomi. A brisk battle took place before the Americans forced the British and their allies to retreat. The Canadians charged the American lines several times, supported by the gunfire of the Indians. Fighting continued sporadically for several hours, with the Canadians and natives fighting log to log, after which Lewis reclaimed Frenchtown. Reynolds' brother commented later that the Essex Militia "fought most bravely, retired slowly from log to log." The skirmish has been noted as one of a few examples when Canadian militia stood fast during the war without the backing of British regulars.

Kentucky Rifleman William Atherton's memoirs testify to the skill of the Essex men and natives at bush fighting, stating "the fight now became very close, and extremely hot ... I received a wound in my right shoulder." The moment before Atherton was hit, he witnessed two of his fellow riflemen move too far forward. One was killed and the other wounded. Atherton described the tactics used by Ebenezer Reynolds and his Canadians: "Their method was to retreat rapidly until they were out of sight (which was soon the case in the brushy woods) and while we were advancing they were preparing to give us another fire; so we were generally under the necessity of firing upon them as they were retreating." Another Kentucky private had similar recollections: "As we advanced they were firing themselves behind logs, trees, etc. to the best advantage." After a long, bloody and exhaustive withdrawal over two miles of woodland, the Canadians and natives slipped away, leaving Frenchtown to the Kentuckians. This skirmish would later be known as the First Battle of the River Raisin.

The Indians burned all 16 houses to the ground, and killed at least two of the town's inhabitants. Sandy Creek was abandoned and never rebuilt.

Second Battle of the River Raisin

Following the recapture of Frenchtown, US Brigadier General James Winchester and the rest of his troops met with Colonel Lewis two days later on January 20, 1813. Winchester had acted without orders, but General William Henry Harrison was pleased with Lewis's success. However, Harrison was concerned that the British forces might combine and overpower Winchester's small force. He ordered additional men, including three companies of the 17th U.S. Infantry and one company of the 19th U.S. Infantry, to move to Frenchtown. He sent a messenger to Winchester to order him to hold the ground and prepare for further combat.

Winchester's soldiers were largely untrained and inexperienced, and the First Battle of the River Raisin was the first combat most had seen. Events showed that Winchester's planning was poor. He had not ensured that ammunition and other necessary supplies were brought forward from the Maumee River. The palisade around the town had not been strengthened, and the regulars of the 17th and 19th U.S. Infantry were camped outside its walls. Several days after the first clash, local residents reported to Winchester that a large British force was heading toward Frenchtown. Winchester ignored their warning, insisting it would be "some days" before the British "would be ready to do anything." His troops were camped throughout Frenchtown. Without ensuring that sentries and pickets had been placed, Winchester retired for the night to his headquarters at the Navarre House south of the town.

On hearing that the Americans had recaptured Frenchtown, Colonel (later British Brigadier General) Henry Procter, commander of the British forces around Detroit, marched with his troops from Fort Malden and crossed the Detroit River from Upper Canada, invading Michigan in strength. His army consisted of 597 regulars from the 41st Regiment of Foot and Royal Newfoundland Fencibles, joined by about 800 Indians. This force linked up with elements of the Essex militia who had fallen back after their initial defeat on January 18. Shawnee leader Tecumseh was in the area, but he was not present at the Battle of Frenchtown. He left command of the Native Americans to Wyandot chiefs Roundhead and Walk-in-the-Water. The Indians included Shawnee, Potawatomi, Ottawa, Chippewa, Delaware, Miami, Winnebago, Creek, Sauk, and Fox tribes. Procter's artillery consisted of six light 3-pounder cannons drawn on sledges, manned by men from the Canadian Provincial Marine under the command of Lieutenant Frédérick Rolette.

Procter surprised the American forces before sunrise on January 22. A Canadian volunteer, John Richardson, who had marched with the 41st Regiment of Foot, later wrote, "On the 22nd, before daybreak, came within sight of the enemy... such was their security and negligence that... our line was actually half formed within musket shot of their defenses before they were even aware of our presence."

The American regulars stood their ground for only twenty minutes. These four companies of infantry, consisting mostly of green recruits, were caught in the open. They faced heavy musket volleys to their front, while they were also under direct roundshot and canister fire from the six 3-pounders and flanked by the Essex militia and the Indians. The regulars broke and ran. General Winchester was awakened by the artillery fire and rushed to the battlefield, ordering 240 men from the 1st Kentucky Rifle Regiment under Col. John Allen to reinforce the regulars. Allen's men could not reach them. Under fire from three sides, the Americans fell into a headlong retreat toward Ohio. They tried to rally three times, but they were eventually surrounded on a narrow road. Almost 220 of the 400 Americans had been killed, many of them shot, tomahawked, and scalped during the withdrawal; 147 men, including Winchester, were captured by the Indians and Canadian militia. Chief Roundhead stripped Winchester of his uniform before he turned him over to the British, which led to a legend that he was captured in his nightshirt. The remaining Americans were scattered and in no position to fight. The 17th's colonel, John Allen, was shot dead and scalped. Dozens had laid down their weapons in surrender, only to be tomahawked by the Indians. Men of the other units also tried to flee; most were run down and killed. A few succeeded in escaping by simply removing their shoes and running in their stockings, which left footprints in the snow that looked like moccasins. Thus they were not followed. British troops occupied a large barn, which was set on fire by William Orlando Butler to force any British soldiers in hiding from their shelter.

Nevertheless, the 1st and 5th Kentucky Rifle Regiments and the 1st Volunteers continued to hold out in Frenchtown. Losing 5 killed and 40 wounded, they had succeeded in taking a heavy toll on the British artillery. Their marksmen had killed or wounded all but one member of the gun crews manning the three cannon in the center of the British line, plus 13 of the 16-man howitzer crew. They had also brought down many infantrymen. Now, however, they were finally running out of ammunition, having repulsed three British assaults. Gen. Procter demanded Winchester order his remaining men to surrender. Otherwise, all would be killed and Frenchtown burned. Procter insisted on an unconditional surrender and refused Winchester's counter-proposals, since Winchester was already his prisoner. Major George Madison, a United States officer still on the battlefield, persuaded Procter to accept a surrender on the promise that all would be protected as prisoners of war.

When they saw the British waving a white flag, the Kentucky riflemen thought it meant a call for a truce. Instead, a British officer handed them a written order from General Winchester to surrender. They refused and decided to fight to the death rather than trust the Potawatomi. After another three hours of fighting, Major Madison issued a formal declaration of surrender.

Procter tried several times to persuade the Native Americans to burn Frenchtown, but the Potawatomi refused. They had given the land to the settlers and did not wish to inflict more harm on them.

River Raisin Massacre

Immediately after the American surrender, some of the Kentuckians argued with their officers that "they would rather die on the field" than surrender, fearing that they would be killed by their captors. Still, the fighting ceased immediately following their surrender. At least 300 Americans were estimated killed, with over 500 taken prisoner. Procter determined on a hasty retreat in case General Harrison sent more troops when he learned of Winchester's defeat, he marched the uninjured prisoners north and across the frozen Detroit River to Fort Malden; the wounded prisoners unable to walk were left behind at Frenchtown. Procter could have waited another day for sleds to arrive to transport the wounded prisoners, but he worried that more American soldiers were on the way from the south.

On the morning of January 23, the Native Americans robbed the injured Americans in Frenchtown. Any prisoner who could walk at all was marched toward Fort Malden; those who could not were killed. The Native Americans then set fire to the buildings that housed the wounded. As the Potawatomi marched prisoners north toward Detroit, they killed any who could not keep up. According to an account from a survivor, "The road was for miles strewed with the mangled bodies." Estimates of the numbers of wounded killed by Indians range from a low of 30 to as many as 100.

Medard Labbadie, a resident of the River Raisin area, in his transcribed deposition sent to the US House of Representatives, stated "Those soldiers and citizens able to walk were marched off towards Malden. The wounded, numbering between 60 and 80 were left in two houses without any of their friends or physicians to take care of them and without any British officers or men. About ten Indians remained behind while the balance went off with the British...". However, the following morning "about fifty Indians returned and between  9 and 10 o'clock A.M. commenced killing the wounded, then set fire to the houses that the wounded were in,..."

Surgeon's mate Gustavus Bower stated in his deposition, “I saw the Indians take off several prisoners whom I afterwards saw in the road, in a most mangled condition, and entirely stripped of their clothing. ... [Private Blythe] whilst in the act of pleading for mercy, an Indian more savage than the other stepped up behind, tomahawked, stripped and scalped him."
Bower further stated "While in the midst of marching, the Indians halted some of their prisoners at Sandy Creek, about three miles from the battleground and commenced cooking and eating, when an Indian came up to one Mr. Searls. The Indian proposed exchanging moccasins which was speedily done. They then exchanged hats, after which the Indian inquired how many men General Harrison had with him and at the same time calling Searls a “Washington” or “Madison". The Indian then raised his tomahawk and struck him on the shoulder which cut into the cavity of the body. Searls then caught hold of the tomahawk and appeared to resist and upon my telling that his fate was inevitable, he closed his eyes and received the savage blow which terminated his existence. I was near enough to him to receive the brains and blood, after that fatal blow on my blanket. A short time after the death of Searls, I saw three others share a similar fate.

The slaughter of the American wounded on January 23 became known as the River Raisin Massacre. It so horrified Americans that it overshadowed the battle, and news of the massacre spread throughout the country. It devastated Kentucky, which had supplied most of the soldiers for the campaign. Kentucky lost many of its leading citizens in either the battle or the subsequent massacre. The rallying cry "Remember the River Raisin" or "Remember the Raisin!" led many more Kentuckians to enlist for the war.

Aftermath

While it is not known how many soldiers died during the First Battle of the River Raisin on January 18, 1813, Eaton's Compilation  lists 397 Americans killed and 27 wounded during the January 22 conflict. Also, figures for those who were killed during the subsequent River Raisin Massacre are unknown, but estimates are as high as 100 killed. Two weeks after the battle, Brigadier General James Winchester reported that 547 of his men were taken as prisoners and only 33 escaped the battlefield. Winchester was imprisoned for more than a year before being released and reassigned to military service.

James Winchester largely bore the responsibility for the devastating loss at Frenchtown. His ill-prepared defensive planning following the successful First Battle of the River Raisin led to the defeat of his army and the high number of deaths suffered by his column. If Winchester had retreated to the Maumee River to rejoin with General Harrison's column, the two could have strengthened their numbers and marched back to Frenchtown with the necessary troops and preparedness to fight the British and Native Americans.  Instead, Winchester remained in Frenchtown with his small force despite advanced knowledge of a British and Native American counterattack. He was unaware that Harrison's troops were on their way and would arrive shortly.  During the Second Battle of the River Raisin, Winchester was captured early in the battle and surrendered his army at the urging of British Colonel Henry Procter. While Winchester's army suffered heavy losses at the start of the surprise attack, the Kentuckians regrouped and fought off three waves of British lines to protect their camp. They were very low on ammunition when the order of surrender came from Winchester.  If the Americans had prolonged the battle long enough for Harrison's column to arrive at Frenchtown, the outcome of the battle could have changed.

The British reported casualties of 24 killed and 161 wounded; Native American casualties are not known to have been documented. Immediately following the battle, Procter, fearing that General Harrison would send more Americans to Frenchtown, made a hasty retreat slightly north to Brownstown. Harrison was forced to call off his plans for a winter campaign to retake Detroit. The city was held by the British until a United States victory at the Battle of Lake Erie on September 10, 1813 allowed the recapture of Detroit. Frenchtown was held as a stronghold by the British until Colonel Richard Mentor Johnson from Kentucky led his cavalry to liberate the town on September 27, 1813. The retreating British were pushed back into Upper Canada, where they were defeated at the Battle of the Thames on October 5.

Three active battalions of the Regular Army (1-3 Inf, 2-3 Inf and 4-3 Inf) perpetuate the lineage of the old 17th and 19th Infantry Regiments, both of which had elements in action during fighting at Frenchtown.

Legacy and honors

Nine counties in Kentucky were later named for officers who fought in the Battle of Frenchtown.  Of the following list, Bland Ballard was the only one to survive.
 Allen County (after Lieutenant Colonel John Allen)
 Ballard County (after Major Bland Ballard)
 Edmonson County (after Captain John Edmonson)
 Graves County (after Major Benjamin Franklin Graves)
 Hart County (after Captain Nathaniel G. S. Hart)
 Hickman County (after Captain Paschal Hickman)
 McCracken County (after Captain Virgil McCracken)
 Meade County (after Captain James M. Meade)
 Simpson County (after Captain John Simpson)

Several streets in Monroe, Michigan near the battle site have been named to memorialize those who fought in the Battle of Frenchtown, including Kentucky Avenue and Winchester Street. In addition, the state of Michigan erected a monument in downtown Monroe in 1904. The monument is located on the west side of South Monroe Street (M-125) at the corner of 7th Street. Also, on this site were interred the unidentified remains of some of the victims of the battle or massacre.

The core area where the battle took place was listed as a Michigan Historic Site on February 18, 1956. The location of the site is bounded by North Dixie Highway, the River Raisin, Detroit Avenue, and Mason Run Creek.

The site was recognized nationally when it was added to the National Register of Historic Places on December 10, 1982.  The River Raisin National Battlefield Park was authorized on March 30, 2009 with the passing of the Omnibus Public Land Management Act, and funded later that year. It is one of four National Battlefield Parks in the United States, and the only one to commemorate the War of 1812.

Notes

References

External links
 Official battlefield site
 Description of the battle at the city of Monroe website
 River Raisin Battlefield brochure

Conflicts in 1813
Massacres by Native Americans
Frenchtown
Frenchtown
Monroe County, Michigan
January 1813 events
Native American history of Michigan